Ronald L. Haeberle (born circa 1940) is a former United States Army photographer best known for the photographs he took of the My Lai Massacre on March 16, 1968.

The monochrome photographs he took were made using an Army camera and were either subject to censorship or did not depict any South Vietnamese casualties when published in an Army newspaper. On the other hand, Haeberle took color photographs with his own camera while on duty the same day, which he kept and later sold to the media. The then-Sgt. Haeberle, having returned to his hometown of Cleveland, Ohio after an honorable discharge, offered them to The Plain Dealer; the newspaper published some of them on November 20, 1969. Haeberle soon after sold the photos to Life magazine, which were published in the December 5, 1969 issue. One of the photos in particular became iconic of the massacre, in large part because of its use in the And babies poster, which was distributed around the world used in protest marches where it was televised and reproduced in newspapers.

Lieutenant General Peers' contrary statement to the press in 1970 notwithstanding, in 2009, Haeberle admitted that he destroyed a number of photographs he took during the My Lai Massacre. Unlike the photographs of the dead bodies, the destroyed photographs depicted Americans in the process of murdering South Vietnamese civilians.

Background
According to Camilla Griggers, professor of Visual Communication and Linguistics at California State University:

The Army photographer, Ronald Haeberle, assigned to Charlie Company on March 16, 1968 had two cameras. One was an Army standard; one was his personal camera. The film on the Army-owned camera, i.e., the official camera of the State, showed standard operations ­ that is "authorized" and "official" operations including interrogating villagers and burning "insurgent" huts. What the film on the personal camera showed, however, was different. When turned over to the press and Government by the photographer, those "unofficial" photographs provided the grounds for a court martial. Haeberle's personal images (owned by himself and not the US Government) showed hundreds of villagers who had been killed by U.S. troops. More significantly, they showed that the dead were primarily women and children, including infants.

As is evident from comments made in a 1969 telephone conversation between United States National Security Advisor Henry Kissinger and Secretary of Defense Melvin Laird, revealed recently by the National Security Archive, the photos of the war crime were too shocking for senior officials to stage an effective cover-up. Secretary of Defense Laird is heard to say, "There are so many kids just lying there; these pictures are authentic."

Haeberle later testified that he personally saw about 30 different U.S. soldiers kill about 100 civilians.

According to the investigation, Haeberle previously "withheld and suppressed from proper authorities the photographic evidence of atrocities he had obtained" despite "having a particular duty to report any knowledge of suspected or apparent war crimes".

However Haeberle had claimed in his testimony that he did not turn in his photographic film of the atrocities to the brigade information office, because "if you take a photograph of a general smiling wrong in the photograph, you destroyed that photograph", therefore Haeberle felt his photographs would have been destroyed if he had turned them in as was standard practice.

Aftermath
During the summer of 2012, Ron Haeberle visited Vietnam and My Lai hamlet, where he met with Tran Van Duc, a survivor of the My Lai massacre.

See also

 And babies

References

External links 
 Plain Dealer exclusive in 1969: My Lai massacre photos by Ronald Haeberle from The Plain Dealer
 Testimony of Ronald Haeberle, Witness for the Prosecution from the website of the UMKC School of Law
 Photo Gallery: Photographic Evidence of the Massacre at My Lai PBS, American Experience

Year of birth uncertain
Living people
20th-century American photographers
United States Army personnel of the Vietnam War
Mỹ Lai massacre
United States Army soldiers
1940s births